Alberto Agustín Castillo Gallardo (born May 5, 1963) is a former Peruvian professional footballer and currently manager.

Playing career

Alianza Lima 
He started his career with Alianza Lima in 1973. He was part of the squad that won the 1975 tournament. He played in the Peruvian Segunda División until 1978, when he moved to Club Atlético Chalaco.

Deportivo Cuenca 
In 1989, he traveled to Ecuador to play with Deportivo Cuenca.

Atlético Marte 
In 1990, Castillo joined Atlético Marte of El Salvador, he then moved to Costa Rica to play with Herediano.

Águila 
In 1994, he returned to El Salvador to play with Águila.

FAS 
In 1996, he signed with FAS, where he retired.

Coaching career

Deportivo Municipal 
In 1997, he began his coaching career with Deportivo Municipal in his native country of Peru.

Municipal Limeño 
In August 2000, Castillo signed as new coach of Municipal Limeño of El Salvador, replacing Rubén Alonso.

Castillo led them to the Apertura 2000 final, but they were defeated by Águila (2–3).

FAS 
Most of his success was when he became the manager of FAS in July 2001, replacing Rubén Guevara. Castillo led them to win the Clausura 2002, Apertura 2002, Apertura 2003, Apertura 2004 and Clausura 2005. Also, FAS lost the Clausura 2004 final against Alianza on penalties.

In October 2005, Castillo was replaced by Carlos de los Cobos.

Chalatenango 
In September 2005, Castillo signed as new coach of Chalatenango, replacing Carlos Alberto Mijangos. Castillo was replaced by Vladan Vićević in 2007.

Águila 
In December 2007, he signed as coach of Águila, replacing Luis Ramírez Zapata. In December 2008, Castillo was replaced by Pablo Centrone.

Luis Ángel Firpo 
In December 2008, he signed as coach of Luis Ángel Firpo, replacing Óscar Emigdio Benítez. Castillo led them to the Clausura 2009 final, but they were defeated by Isidro Metapán (0–1).

In December 2009, Castillo was replaced by Hugo Coria.

Suchitepéquez 
He then accepted to coach Suchitepéquez of Guatemala, and helped the small club reach the semi-finals of the Clausura 2010.

Return to FAS 
In January 2011, Castillo signed again as coach FAS, replacing Jorge Abrego. Castillo led them to the Clausura 2011 final, which they lost against Alianza (1–2 defeat). At the end of the tournament, he returned to Peru to coach Sport Boys.

El Salvador 
On December 17, 2012, he was announced as new manager to El Salvador, replacing Juan de Dios Castillo. On December 20, 2013, he was sacked as manager of El Salvador.

Second return to FAS 
In September 2014, Castillo signed as coach of FAS, replacing Efraín Burgos. Castillo led them to the Apertura 2015 final, but they were defeated by Alianza (0–1 defeat). In December 2015, Castillo was replaced by Carlos "Ché" Martínez.

Sonsonate 
In May 2016, Castillo signed as new coach of Sonsonate for the Apertura 2016, replacing Ennio Mendoza and Mario Elias Guevara. Castillo led them to the semi-finals of that tournament, but they were defeated by Alianza 0–4 on aggregate.

He left the club in February 2017.

Return to Suchitepéquez 
In December 2017, Castillo signed again as coach of Suchitepéquez.

Isidro Metapán 
In March 2018, Castillo signed as new coach of Isidro Metapán, replacing Edwin Portillo. In December 2018, Isidro Metapán reached the quarter-finals of the Apertura 2018, but they were defeated by FAS 0–2 on aggregate. On 12 December 2018, Castillo left the club.

Honours

Manager

Club
C.D. Municipal Limeño
 Primera División
 Runners-up: Apertura 2000

C.D. FAS
 Primera División
 Champion: Clausura 2002, Apertura 2002, Apertura 2003, Apertura 2004, Clausura 2005
 Runners-up: Clausura 2004, Clausura 2011, Apertura 2015

C.D. Luis Ángel Firpo
 Primera División
 Runners-up: Clausura 2009

References

External links
 Agustín Castillo at Soccerway 

 

1963 births
Living people
People from Ica, Peru
Peruvian footballers
Peru international footballers
Peruvian football managers
Association football midfielders
Atlético Chalaco footballers
Club Alianza Lima footballers
Deportivo Municipal footballers
C.D. Cuenca footballers
C.S. Herediano footballers
Expatriate footballers in Ecuador
Expatriate footballers in Costa Rica
Expatriate footballers in El Salvador
C.D. Atlético Marte footballers
C.D. Águila footballers
C.D. FAS footballers
C.D. FAS managers
C.D. Águila managers
C.D. Luis Ángel Firpo managers
C.D. Suchitepéquez managers
Deportivo Municipal managers
Municipal Limeño managers
Sport Boys managers
Expatriate football managers in El Salvador
Expatriate football managers in Guatemala
El Salvador national football team managers
Unión Comercio managers